Micaela Flores Amaya, La Chunga (The Difficult Woman), (Marseille, 1938) is a Spanish flamenco dancer and painter of naïf art.

Biography
Micaela Flores Amaya was born in Marseille in 1938, although the exact date of her birth remains unknown. Her parents were Andalusian Romani who emigrated to France during the Spanish Civil War. When she was less than a year old Micaela's family moved to Barcelona.

She started dancing when she was six years-old in "Ca La Rosita", a well-known bodega for the romanì community in El Poble-Sec. It was at this time she was discovered by a painter by the name of Paco Rebés, who later becomes her godfather and protector, during one of her improvised street performances and he takes her under his tutelage. Micaela Flores Amaya became the muse of several writers like Blas de Otero, Rafael Alberti, José Manuel Caballero Bonald and León Felipe, and several painters, including Picasso, Dalí and Francisco Rebés who made her an attractive character for intellectuals and encouraged her to paint. A 1958 photo shows Salvador Dalí inviting her to make art by dancing on a blank canvas. During intervals, Dali would paint beneath her feet. She was known for her barefoot style of flamenco dance and described as "The Barefoot Dancer". She was admired by Picasso as a "shining naif". She also exhibited in several galleries in Paris and Madrid.

Pastora Imperio contracted her in 1956 and thanks to Ava Gardner, she took part in two Hollywood movies. The businessman Sullivan introduced her in Las Vegas and she participated in various TV programs in the United States and Mexico.

Since then, she has participated in many tours and some movies. She married the cinema director José Luis Gonzalvo and they had a daughter, Pilar.

Filmography
Tip on a Dead Jockey (1957) directed by Richard Thorpe
Back to the Door  (1959) directed by José María Forqué
El último verano  (1961) by Juan Bosch
Juan Pedro the Scyther ( (1969) by José Luis Gonzalvo
 "Cierto reflejos: La Chunga"  (1978) by Mario Gomez Martin 
Vampire in Venice  (1988) by Augusto Caminito 
Papa Piquillo  (1998) by Alvaro Saenz de Heredia

Prizes
Medalla de Oro del Círculo de Bellas Artes de Madrid,
Medalla Oro de la Asociación de la Prensa de Sevilla
Trofeo Delfín de Alicante
Premio del Ayuntamiento de Alicante
Premio Cidale de los Almendros.

References

External links
Biografía

1938 births
Living people
Spanish Romani people
Romani dancers
Romani painters
Flamenco dancers
Spanish female dancers
20th-century Spanish painters
21st-century Spanish painters
20th-century Spanish women artists
21st-century Spanish women artists